Carlos Anselmo Mejía del Cid (born 13 November 1991) is a Guatemalan professional footballer who plays for Liga Nacional club Antigua and the Guatemala national team.

International career

International goals
Scores and results list Guatemala's goal tally first.

Honours

Club
Comunicaciones 
 Liga Nacional de Guatemala: Apertura 2012, Clausura 2013, Apertura 2013, Clausura 2014, Apertura 2014

International
 Copa Centroamericana runner-up: 2014

References

External links 
 
 
 Profile at eurosport.co.uk

1991 births
Living people
Association football defenders
Guatemalan footballers
2014 Copa Centroamericana players
2015 CONCACAF Gold Cup players
Comunicaciones F.C. players
People from Santa Rosa Department, Guatemala
Guatemala international footballers